Head of St. Margarets Bay is a rural community on the northeast corner of St. Margarets Bay.
The community is in the Halifax Regional Municipality, 40 km west from Halifax via  on Trunk 3.

History
The bay was named after Samuel de Champlain's mother Marguerite. His map of 1612  shows the bay as St. Marguerite Baie. The community is the site of the St. Margaret's Bay Hydroelectric System, built in 1922, the oldest hydro plant in Nova Scotia.

Demographics 

Communications
Telephone exchange 902 – 826
 First three digits of postal code – B3Z
 Cable Internet access – Eastlink

Schools
St. Margarets Bay Elementary

References

 Explore HRM

Communities in Halifax, Nova Scotia
General Service Areas in Nova Scotia